Vitaliy Ivanko (born 9 April 1992) is a Ukrainian professional footballer who plays as a forward.

Club career
He is the product of the Metalurh Donetsk Youth school system. He played for FC Helios Kharkiv in the Ukrainian First League.

References

1992 births
Living people
Footballers from Kharkiv
Association football forwards
Ukrainian footballers
Ukraine under-21 international footballers
Ukrainian expatriate footballers
Ukrainian Premier League players
Cypriot First Division players
FC Metalurh Donetsk players
AEK Larnaca FC players
FC Belshina Bobruisk players
FC Helios Kharkiv players
FC Kolkheti-1913 Poti players
Panegialios F.C. players
SC Tavriya Simferopol players
Expatriate footballers in Cyprus
Expatriate footballers in Belarus
Expatriate footballers in Georgia (country)
Expatriate footballers in Greece
Expatriate footballers in Montenegro
Ukrainian expatriate sportspeople in Cyprus
Ukrainian expatriate sportspeople in Belarus
Ukrainian expatriate sportspeople in Georgia (country)
Ukrainian expatriate sportspeople in Greece
Ukrainian expatriate sportspeople in Montenegro